Marcus (Greek: Μάρκος, died August 476) was the son of the Eastern Roman general and usurper Basiliscus and Zenonis. He was acclaimed caesar in 475 and later promoted to augustus, ruling as junior co-emperor to his father. When Zeno reoccupied Constantinople in late August 476, Marcus, with his parents, hid in a church. Zeno swore he would not spill their blood, and instead had them exiled to Limnae in Cappadocia, where they were then starved to death.

History

Rise to power
Marcus was the son of Basiliscus and Zenonis. When Byzantine Emperor Leo (457–474) fell ill in 473, he had his grandson, Leo II ( 474), the son of Zeno (474–475, 476–491) and Ariadne, crowned as emperor in October 473. Leo died on 18 January 474, and Leo II took the throne. Zeno was installed as co-emperor, crowned on 29 January, and when Leo II died in Autumn, Zeno became the sole eastern emperor. Zeno was very unpopular, among both the common people and the senatorial class, in part simply because he was an Isaurian, a race that had acquired a poor reputation under Emperor Arcadius (383–408), and also because his rule would induce a promotion of fellow Isuarians to high positions. Although Verina had supported Zeno's elevation as co-emperor to Leo II, she turned against him once he became sole emperor. Verina conspired with others to remove him as emperor, and historians generally accept that she planned to install her lover, the  Patricius, as emperor and to marry him. She was supported in this plot by the general Theoderic Strabo, angered by Zeno's coronation, and Marcus' father Basiliscus, who succeeded in recruiting Illus and Trocundes, Isaurian brothers, as well as her nephew Armatus. The plot had the backing of the military, bolstered by Basiliscus' popularity, and that of Illus and Trocundes, and also the support of the Eastern Roman Senate. The position of the Patriarch of Constantinople, Acacius, is unclear, although the historian Kamilla Twardowska considers it likely that he would have withheld support from either side until the outcome was clear. The exact date the conspiracy began is unknown: historian Maciej Salamon argues it began around 473, whereas Twardowska argues it began only after Zeno took sole power. The conspiracy was successful, as Zeno fled to his native Isauria on 9 January 475, either after learning of the conspiracy or after being convinced by Verina that his life was in danger. Basiliscus convinced the senate to acclaim him emperor, instead of Patricius, and Basiliscus was crowned at the Hebdomon palace.

Reign with Basiliscus
Basiliscus quickly lost support in Constantinople, through a combination of heavy taxes and heretical ecclesiastical policies, as well as a natural disaster. A large fire broke out in the quarter of Chalkoprateia in 475/476, before quickly spreading. Illus and Trocundes, laying siege to Zeno in his native lands, defected to him. However, the historian Mirosław Leszka challenges this, arguing that the most likely reason why Theophanes does not specify the promises is that he invented them. Leszka doubts that Basiliscus would entrust military command to men he had lied to, and argues that they were motivated instead by fear that Basiliscus would be overthrown, or else religious opposition to him. From February/March 476, Basiliscus remained in the Hebdomon, out of fear of the capital's populace; this news may also have motivated Ilus and Trocundes, who had also received letters from ministers in the capital. These letters informed them that the city was now ready to restore Zeno, as the people had become even less supportive of Basiliscus due to the "fiscal rapacity of his ministers", as Bury puts it. Illus had recently taken captive Longinus, Zeno's brother, and may have calculated that this gave him leverage over the deposed emperor: he arranged to ally with Zeno, and they began to march towards Constantinople with their combined forces.

Basiliscus ordered Armatus to take command of all the troops in Thrace and Constantinople, as well as the palace guard, and lead them against the three. He allowed Zeno to pass to Constantinople unhindered, and Zeno entered Constantinople unopposed in August 476. Basiliscus, Marcus, and his family fled and hid in a church, only leaving once Zeno swore he would not execute them. Zeno had them exiled to Limnae in Cappadocia, where they were imprisoned in a dried-up cistern, and left to starve to death. According to some sources, they were instead beheaded.

Coinage
The coinage of Basiliscus and Marcus was unusual in that it associated the two emperors together on the coin, rather than separate coins being minted in Marcus' name.

Sources

Notes

References

Bibliography

 
 
 
 
 
 
 
 
 
 
 
 
 
 

House of Leo
Imperial Roman consuls
476 deaths
5th-century Byzantine emperors
5th-century Roman consuls
Year of birth unknown
People executed by starvation
Byzantine exiles